Rogelio Enrique San Francisco Cobo (10 March 1955 – 1 March 2021), better known as Quique San Francisco, was a Spanish actor and comedian. He was a noted figure in the so-called cine quinqui scene.

Biography 

Enrique marked his theatre debut with El sueño de una noche de verano. In 1965, he started his Television career with Televisión Española's show Santi, botones de hotel at the age of 10. and Diario Vasco on 13 March 1965.

In 1975, he joined Madrid Actors' Studio.

In 1975, he starred in the TV series El pícaro, directed by Fernando Fernán Gómez. He appeared in acclaimed films directed by Eloy de la Iglesia such as Colegas (1982), Navajeros (1980) o El pico (1983) in the 1980s.

On 24 October 2002, Enrique suffered a severe accident which led to his prolonged illness. He later appeared in Television Series Cuéntame cómo pasó (2001-2008).

His theatre plays include Frankie y la boda (1965), Los ochenta son nuestros (1988), La noche del sábado (1991), Decíamos ayer (1997), Entre fuerte y flojo (2004), Hijos de mamá (2005), Misterioso asesinato en Manhattan (2007), El enfermo imaginario (2009), Arte (2010), ¡Se quieren! (2011), remake of 2002 drama Amparo Larrañaga and Orquesta Club Virginia (2012), adaptation of 1992 theatre film of the same title. 
As a Radio Presenter, he worked in shows like No somos nadie in M80 Radio. He also lent his voice to Loquillo y Trogloditas (El Mánager) with Rosario Flores (Gypsy Funky Love Me Do) and with La Fuga (Humo y cristales) etc.

San Francisco died on 1 March 2021, aged 65.

Filmography 
 Hombres y mujeres de blanco (1962), by Enrique Carreras.
 Diferente (1962), by Luis María Delgado.
 El aprendiz de clown (1967), by Manuel Esteba Gallego.
 La banda del Pecas (1968), by Jesús Pascual Aguilar.
 Le Paria (1969), by Claude Carliez avec Jean Marais.
 Un invierno en Mallorca (1969), by Jaime Camino.
 Estoy hecho un chaval (1975), by Pedro Lazaga.
 La larga noche de los bastones blancos (1977), by Javier Elorrieta.
 Arriba Hazaña (1978), by José María Gutiérrez.
 Sentados al borde de la mañana, con los pies colgando (1978), by Antonio José Betancor.
 Navajeros (1980), by Eloy de la Iglesia.
 Maravillas (1981), by Manuel Gutiérrez Aragón.
 La mujer del ministro (1981), by Eloy de la Iglesia.
 Colegas (1982), by Eloy de la Iglesia.
 El pico (1983), by Eloy de la Iglesia.
 Amanece, que no es poco (1988), by José Luis Cuerda.
 La huella del crimen: El crimen del expreso de Andalucía (TV) (1991), by Imanol Uribe.
 Orquesta Club Virginia (1992), by Manuel Iborra.
 Acción mutante (1993), by Álex de la Iglesia.
 La mujer de tu vida: La mujer gafe (TV) (1994), by Imanol Uribe.
 La mujer de tu vida: La mujer vacía (TV) (1994), by Manuel Iborra.
 Tirano Banderas (1995), by José Luis García Sánchez.
 Así en el cielo como en la tierra (1995), by José Luis Cuerda.
 La ley de la frontera (1995), by Adolfo Aristarain.
 Belmonte (1995), by Juan Sebastián Bollaín.
 Hotel y domicilio (1995), by Ernesto Del Río.
 La leyenda de Balthasar el castrado (1996), by Juan Miñón.
 Pepe Guindo (1999), by Manuel Iborra.
 París-Tombuctú (1999), by Luis García Berlanga.
 Más pena que gloria (2000), by Víctor García León.
 El chocolate del loro (2001), by Ernesto Martín Ataz.
 Sinfín (2005), by Manuel Sanabria and Carlos Villaverde.
 Hot Milk (2005), by Ricardo Bofill Maggiora.
 La dama boba (2005), by Manuel Iborra.
 Animal Crisis (2008), by Pedro Rivero.
 Save the Zombies (2013), by Federico López.
 Sin rodeos (2018), diredcted by Santiago Segura.
 4 latas (2019), directed by Gerardo Olivares.

Television 
Series and fictions
 Estudio 1 (1971–80) in TVE.
 Los libros (1974–77) in TVE.
 Cuentos y leyendas (1978) in TVE.
 Los pintores del Prado (1974) in TVE. 
 El pícaro (1975) in TVE.
 Curro Jiménez (1976) in TVE.
 Proceso a Mariana Pineda (1984) in TVE.
 Miguel Servet, la sangre y la ceniza (1989) in TVE.
 La mujer de tu vida (1990–94) in TVE.
 Compuesta y sin novio (1994) in Antena 3.
 Colegio Mayor (1994) in Telemadrid.
 Los ladrones van a la oficina (1993–95) in Antena 3.
 Ni contigo ni sin ti (1998) in Televisa.
 Condenadas a entenderse (1998) in TVE.
 Ellas son así (1999) in Telecinco.
 Un paso adelante (2005) in Antena 3.
 Cuéntame cómo pasó (2001–08) in TVE.
 Aída (2005) in Telecinco.
 Águila Roja (2015) in TVE.
 Gym Tony (2016) in Cuatro.
 Follow San Francisco (2019) in Flooxer.

Programs
 La bola de cristal (1987–88) in TVE.
 La noche con Fuentes y cía (2001–04) in Telecinco.
 Un, dos, tres... a leer esta vez (2004) in TVE.
 El club de la comedia (2000, 2001, 2002, 2003, 2004, 2011 and 2012) in Canal+ 1, Antena 3 and La Sexta
 El hormiguero (2007–19) (Guest) in Cuatro (2007–11) and Antena 3 (2011–19)
 Mi casa es la tuya (2018) in Telecinco

Awards and nominations 
Goya Awards

Actors' Union Awards

Other Awards
 Gijón International Film Festival Best Actor Award for El aprendiz de clown (1968) 
 Culture Ministry's Best Actor Award - 1979

References

External links 

 

1955 births
2021 deaths
Male actors from Madrid
Spanish film actors
Spanish television actors
20th-century Spanish male actors
21st-century Spanish male actors
Deaths from pneumonia in Spain